Fairford Park is a  estate in the southern Cotswolds in Gloucestershire, England, close to the small town of Fairford. Purchased by Ernest Cook from the Barker family in 1945, the former stables and coach house of Fairford Park House are used as the headquarters of the Ernest Cook Trust, which now owns the estate.

During the Second World War, the 17th-century Fairford Park House was used as an American military hospital, and until 1959 Polish refugees were housed in a camp in the park. The house was demolished in the 1950s, and its site is now occupied by Farmor's Comprehensive School.

References

Geography of Gloucestershire
Farms in Gloucestershire
Country estates in England
Fairford